Viktor Bychkov (born 14 January 1938) is a Russian sprinter. He competed in the men's 400 metres at the 1964 Summer Olympics.

References

External links
 

1938 births
Living people
Athletes (track and field) at the 1964 Summer Olympics
Russian male sprinters
Olympic athletes of the Soviet Union
Place of birth missing (living people)
Soviet male sprinters